The Campo Verano (Italian: Cimitero del Verano) is a cemetery in Rome, Italy,   founded in the early 19th century. The monumental cemetery is currently divided into sections: the Catholic cemetery, the Jewish cemetery, and the monument to the victims of World War I.

History
The Verano (officially the "Communal Monumental Cemetery of Campo Verano") is located in the quartiere Tiburtino of Rome, near the Basilica of San Lorenzo fuori le mura. The name verano refers to the Ancient Roman campo dei Verani that was located here.

The zone contained ancient Christian catacombs. A modern cemetery was not established until the Napoleonic Kingdom of Italy during 1807–1812, when the architect Giuseppe Valadier was commissioned for designs after the  required burials to take place outside of the city walls. The papal authorities still have some control over the administration. Pope Francis celebrated All Saints Day Mass here on a papal visit to the cemetery on 1 November 2014.

Notable burials

19th century 
 Włodzimierz Czacki, (1834–1888), Cardinal, Apostolic nuncio to France (1879–1882)
 Marià Fortuny (1838–1874), Catalan painter
 Stanisław Klicki (1775–1847), Polish military commander
 Silvio Spaventa (1822–1893), patriot and politician

20th century 

 Elio de Angelis (1958–1986), F1 racing driver
 Pedro Arrupe, S.J. (1907–1991), Superior General of the Society of Jesus (1965–1983)
 Ennio Balbo (1922–1989), film actor
 Gunhild Bergh (1888–1961), Swedish writer, journalist, literary historian
 Alessandro Blasetti, (1900–1987), film director
 Mario Brega, (1923–1994), film actor
 Bruno Corbucci, (1931–1996), film director and screenwriter
 Sergio Corbucci, (1926–1990), film director and screenwriter
 Eduardo De Filippo, (1900–1984), stage and film actor
 Peppino De Filippo, (1903–1980), stage and film actor
 Fr. , S.J. (1904–2000), French Jesuit and eminent Thomist philosopher
 Vittorio De Sica, (1901–1974), film actor, director and screenwriter
 Aldo Fabrizi, (1905–1990), film actor
 Ronald Firbank (1886–1926), English novelist
 Mariano Fortuny y Madrazo (1871–1949) ‒ Spanish fashion designer, lighting engineer, and painter
 Rino Gaetano (1950–1981), singer and songwriter
 Aleksander Gierymski (1850–1901), Polish painter
 Nilde Iotti (1920–1999), politician and partisan, President of the Chamber of Deputies (1979–1992)
 Luciano Lama (1921–1996), politician and trade unionist
 Franco Latini (1927–1991), actor and voice actor
 Ugo La Malfa (1903–1979), politician and partisan
 Nanni Loy, (1925–1995), film director and screenwriter
 Luigi Luzzatti (1841–1927), Prime minister of Italy between 1910 and 1911.
 Marcello Mastroianni, OMRI (1924–1996), film actor
 Charles Kenneth Scott Moncrieff (1889–1930), Scottish translator of the Marcel Proust novel Remembrance of Things Past
 Alberto Moravia (1907–1990), novelist and journalist
 Alessandro Moreschi (1858–1922), last surviving castrato at the time of his death
 Claudia Muzio (1889–1936), soprano
 Ernesto Nathan (1845–1921), politician, Mayor of Rome (1907–1913)
 Pietro Nenni (1891–1980), politician and partisan
 Francesco Saverio Nitti (1868–1953), politician, Prime Minister (1919–20)
 Francis J. Parater (1897–1920), American seminarian
 Giuseppe Paratore (1876–1967), politician, President of the Senate (1952–1953)
 Clara Petacci (1912–1945), mistress of the Italian dictator Benito Mussolini
 Liberius Pieterse (1905–1973), Dutch Capuchin Franciscan friar
 Antonio Pietrangeli, (1919–1968), film director and screenwriter
 Camilla Ravera (1889–1988), politician and partisan
 George Santayana (1863–1952), American/Spanish philosopher, essayist, poet, and novelist
 Giuseppe Saragat (1898–1988), politician, President of Italy (1964–1971)
 Henricus Smeulders, Ocist Apostolic Commissioner to Canada
 Antonio Starabba di Rudinì (1839–1908), politician, Mayor of Palermo (1863–1866) and Prime Minister (1891–1892, 1896–1898)
 Fidelis von Stotzingen O.S.B. (1871–1947), German Abbot Primate, (1913–1947)
 Palmiro Togliatti (1893–1964), politician and partisan
 Cyril Toumanoff (1913–1997), Russian-born American historian and genealogist of Armenian-Georgian descent
 Giuseppe Ungaretti (1888–1970), modernist poet, journalist, essayist
 Luigi Zampa, (1905–1991), film director and screenwriter
 Riccardo Zanella (1875–1959), Fiuman politician, President of the Free State of Fiume (1921–1924)
 Israel Zolli (1881–1956), Jewish convert to Catholicism, professor, author

21st century

 Ferruccio Amendola, (1930–2001), film actor and voice actor
 Giulio Andreotti (1919–2013), politician, Prime Minister (1972–1973, 1976–1979, 1989–1992)
 Enzo Garinei (1926–2022), Italian actor
 Armando Cossutta (1926–2015), politician and partisan
 Ivan Dias (1936–2017), Cardinal, Archbishop of Bombay
 Ciccio Ingrassia, (1922–2003), film actor
 Laura Latini (1969–2012), voice actress
 Oreste Lionello, (1927–2009), film actor and voice actor
 Carlo Lizzani, (1922–2013), film director and screenwriter
 Luigi Magni, (1928–2013), film director and screenwriter
 Siniša Mihajlović (1969–2022), Serbian footballer and manager
 Gillo Pontecorvo, (1919–2006), film director and screenwriter
 Alfredo Reichlin (1925–2017), politician and partisan
 Alberto Sordi, OMRI (1920–2003), film actor and director
 Bud Spencer (born Carlo Pedersoli, 1929–2016), actor
 Bruno Trentin (1926–2007), politician and trade unionist
 Alida Valli (1921–2006), film actress

References

External links
 Association of Significant Cemeteries in Europe: Cimitero del Verano
 GPS coordinates you need to use to find the graves of famous people in the Campo Verano Cemetery
 
 
 

Buildings and structures in Rome
Cemeteries and tombs in Rome
 
Rome Q. VI Tiburtino